"O, wie will ich triumphieren" (or, "Ha, wie will ich triumphieren"), is an aria for low bass from Mozart's singspiel opera Die Entführung aus dem Serail (The Abduction from the Seraglio).  It is well known for the extraordinary technical demands it makes on the singer, and is sometimes performed in recitals and featured in anthologies by basses who are able to sing it.  It features rapid coloratura, abrupt octave-leaps between the upper and lower registers, and extended low notes, including a drawn-out low D (D2, one of the lowest notes demanded of any voice in opera).  Mozart wrote it with one particular bass in mind: the very famous Ludwig Fischer.

Sentiment
Osmin, the bad-tempered house-servant to Pasha Selim, has caught his hated enemies trying to rescue a noblewoman from captivity in the Pasha's harem.  He taunts them, gleefully anticipating the pleasure of seeing them hanged.

References

Arias by Wolfgang Amadeus Mozart
Bass arias
Die Entführung aus dem Serail
Opera excerpts